Fletchersbridge is a hamlet about  east-south-east of Bodmin in Cornwall, England. in the valley of the River Fowey.

References

Hamlets in Cornwall